Liberty Christian School is a private Christian school located in Anderson, Indiana.
Liberty Christian School is a private, non-denominational Christian school serving preschool through 12th grades. Founded in 1976, Liberty has two campuses and a self-electing board governs the school. Liberty Christian is accredited by the Association for Christian Schools International (ACSI) and holds memberships with School Choice Indiana and the Indiana High School Athletic Association (IHSAA).

Sports 
Sports offered in the Washington Campus:

 Archery
 Baseball
 Basketball
 Cross Country
 Soccer
 Swim
 Track & Field
 Volleyball

Accomplishments 
Liberty Christian was the 2015-16 IHSAA class 1A basketball state champions.

See also
 List of high schools in Indiana

References
http://www.maxpreps.com/tournament/48jBdNBiEeW-8KA2nzwbTA/48jCldBiEeW-8KA2nzwbTA/basketball-winter-15-16/2015-16-ihsaa-class-1a-boys-basketball-state-tournament-class-1a-state-championship.htm

External links
 Official Website

Christian schools in Indiana
Schools in Madison County, Indiana
1976 establishments in Indiana